Weronika Kordowiecka (born 13 September 1995) is a Polish handball player who plays for IUVENTA Michalovce and the Poland national team.

Achievements
Mistrzostwa Polski:
Winner: 2017

Puchar Polski:
Winner: 2015, 2016

References
  

  
1995 births
Living people
Sportspeople from Warsaw
Polish female handball players
21st-century Polish women